Come as You Are may refer to:

Film and television
 Come as You Are (2011 film), a Belgian film
 Come as You Are (2019 film), an American remake of the Belgian film
 "Come as You Are" (CSI: Miami), an episode of CSI: Miami 
 "Come as You Are", an episode of Instant Star

Music

Albums
 Come as You Are (album), a 1987 album by Peter Wolf
Come as You Are, a 2004 album by Mindi Abair
Come as You Are, a 1976 album by Ashford & Simpson
Come as You Are, a 2004 album by Beverley Knight
Come as You Are, a 2005 album by Jaci Velasquez

Songs
 "Come as You Are" (Beverley Knight song)
 "Come as You Are" (Nirvana song)
 "Come as You Are", a song by Brandy Norwood from Afrodisiac
 "Come as You Are", a song by Pocket Full of Rocks
 "Come as You Are", a song by Tenille Townes from The Lemonade Stand
 "Come as You Are", a song by Santana from Santana IV
 "Come as You Are", a song by Wild Orchid from Oxygen
 "Come as You Are", a song by Peter Wolf
 "Come as You Are", a song by Crowder

Other uses
 Come as You Are: The Story of Nirvana, a book by Michael Azerrad
 Come as You Are (sex shop), a Toronto-based co-operative sex shop

See also 
 Casual, a type of dress code
 Dress code, the unwritten rule of clothing